Pietro Chiarini (circa 1717; Brescia – 1765; Cremona) was an Italian composer.

From 1738 to 1744, he was in Venice where four of his operas and an oratorio were performed. Later he went to Cremona, where in 1754 he wrote and presented the intermezzo La donna dottor. He was later appointed maestro di cappella at the court of Cremona in 1756. It is speculated that Giovanni Battista Pergolesi's opera Il geloso schernito may in fact have been composed by Chiarini and not Pergolesi.

Operas
Argenide (libretto by Girolamo Alvise Giusti, opera seria, 1738, Venice)
Arianna e Teseo (opera seria, 1739, Brescia)
L'Issipile (libretto by Pietro Metastasio, opera seria, 1740, Brescia)
Il finto pazzo (libretto by Carlo Goldoni after La contadina astuta by Tommaso Mariani, intermezzo, 1741, Venice)
Achille in Sciro (libretto by Pietro Metastasio, opera seria, 1739)
Artaserse (libretto by Pietro Metastasio, opera seria, 1741, Verona)
Statira (libretto by Carlo Goldoni, opera seria, 1741, Venezia)
Amor fa l'uomo cieco (libretto by Carlo Goldoni, intermezzo, 1742, Verona)
Il Ciro riconosciuto (libretto by Pietro Metastasio, opera seria, 1743, Verona)
I fratelli riconosciuti (opera seria, 1743, Verona)
Meride e Salimunte (libretto by Apostolo Zeno, opera seria, 1744, Venezia)
Alessandro nelle Indie (libretto by Pietro Metastasio, opera seria, 1744, Verona)
Il geloso schernito (libretto by Giovanni Bertati, intermezzo, 1746)
La Didone abbandonata (libretto by Pietro Metastasio, opera seria, 1748, Brescia)
La donna dottoressa (intermezzo, 1754, Cremona)
Ezio (libretto by Pietro Metastasio, opera seria, 1757, Cremona)

References

External links
 

1710s births
1765 deaths
Italian male classical composers
Italian opera composers
Male opera composers
Musicians from Brescia
18th-century Italian composers
18th-century Italian male musicians